The 1930 Estonian Football Championship was the 10th official football league season in Estonia. Only four teams, three from Tallinn and one from Narva, took part in the league. All the matches were played in Tallinn and each team played every opponent once for total of 3 games. ESS Kalev Tallinn won their second title.

League table

Top scorers

References

Estonian Football Championship
1
Estonia
Estonia